International Islamic University may refer to:
International Islamic University Malaysia
Sultan Abdul Halim Mu'adzam Shah International Islamic University, Malaysia
Selangor International Islamic University, Malaysia
International Islamic University, Islamabad
International Islamic University, Chittagong
Islamic University of Technology, Bangladesh

See also
Islamic university

Islamic universities and colleges